{{DISPLAYTITLE:C23H30N2O}}
The molecular formula C23H30N2O may refer to:

 AD-1211
 Butyrfentanyl
 Isobutyrylfentanyl
 α-Methylfentanyl
 β-Methylfentanyl
 3-Methylfentanyl